Kalai is an upazila of Joypurhat District in the Division of Rajshahi, Bangladesh.

Geography
It has 23504 households and total area 166.3 km2.

Demographics
As of the 1991 Bangladesh census, Kalai has a population of 114183. Males constitute 50.86% of the population, and females 49.14%. This Upazila's eighteen up population is 60864. Kalai has an average literacy rate of 23.5% (7+ years), and the national average of 32.4% literate.

Administration
Kalai Upazila is divided into Kalai Municipality and five union parishads: Ahammedabad, Matrai, Punot, Udaipur, and Zindarpur. The union parishads are subdivided into 109 mauzas and 148 villages.

Kalai Municipality is subdivided into 9 wards and 34 mahallas.

Education
The famous educational institutions of this Upazila are:
 Kalai Degree College
 Govt. Kalai Womens' Degree College
 Hatior Bahumukhi Fazil Madrasah
 Kalai M.U. Government High School
 Kalai Girls' High School
 Omar Kindergarten School
 Punat High School
 Punat Girls' High School
 Shanti Nagar Adarsha High School

See also
Upazilas of Bangladesh
Districts of Bangladesh
Divisions of Bangladesh

References

Upazilas of Joypurhat District